Brisaster is a genus of echinoderms belonging to the family Schizasteridae.

The genus has almost cosmopolitan distribution.

Species:

Brisaster antarcticus 
Brisaster capensis 
Brisaster fragilis 
Brisaster kerguelenensis 
Brisaster latifrons 
Brisaster moseleyi 
Brisaster owstoni 
Brisaster tasmanicus 
Brisaster townsendi

References

 
Echinoidea genera